Kentucky Route 448 (KY 448) is a  state highway located in Brandenburg, Kentucky. It serves the immediate downtown area.

Route description
KY 448 begins at KY 313 on the southeast side of Brandenburg. From there, KY 448 turns right and travels to the north-northwest. It passes Brandenburg Primary School and David T. Wilson Elementary School. The highway then passes Meade Olin Park and intersects the northern terminus of KY 710 (Old State Road). This intersection is just to the north-northeast of Meade County High School. It curves to the northwest and passes Ramsey Field and intersects the southern terminus of KY 2204 (Main Street). The highway passes the Meade County Chamber of Commerce and curves to the west-southwest. It intersects the eastern terminus of KY 228 (High Street) and curves to the southwest. One block later, it intersects the eastern terminus of KY 1692 (Hillcrest Drive). It passes a U.S. Post Office and the Brandenburg Police Department before it travels just to the west of Meade County High School. It travels through Cap Anderson Cemetery. A short distance later, it meets its northern terminus, an intersection with the northern terminus of  KY 79 and KY 313 (By Pass Road).

History
Previously, KY 448 began at Kentucky Route 144 northwest of Buck Grove. However, in August 2016, Kentucky Route 313 was extended to replace most of the southern end of KY 448 up to the Brandenburg Bypass, truncating KY 448 to its current terminus. A small portion at the southernmost end was turned over to the county.

Major intersections

See also

References

0448
0448